This is a list of sister cities in the United States state of New York. Sister cities, known in Europe as twin towns, are cities which partner with each other to promote human contact and cultural links, although this partnering is not limited to cities and often includes counties, regions, states and other sub-national entities.

Many New York jurisdictions work with foreign cities through Sister Cities International, an organization whose goal is to "promote peace through mutual respect, understanding, and cooperation."

A
Albany

 Nijmegen, Netherlands
 Tula, Russia
 Verona, Italy

Amityville
 Le Bourget, France

B
Binghamton

 Borovichi, Russia
 El Charcón (La Libertad), El Salvador
 La Teste-de-Buch, France

Buffalo

 Aboadze, Ghana
 Cape Coast, Ghana
 Changzhou, China
 Dortmund, Germany
 Drohobych, Ukraine
 Horlivka, Ukraine
 Kanazawa, Japan
 Kiryat Gat, Israel

 Rzeszów, Poland
 Saint Ann, Jamaica
 Siena, Italy
 Torremaggiore, Italy
 Tver, Russia
 Yıldırım, Turkey

C
Cheektowaga
 Łowicz, Poland

Columbia County
 Larreynaga, Nicaragua

Corning

 Kakegawa, Japan
 Lviv, Ukraine
 San Giovanni Valdarno, Italy

Coventry
 Coventry, England, United Kingdom

G
Glen Cove
 Sturno, Italy

Glens Falls
 Saga, Japan

Great Neck Plaza
 Tiberias, Israel

Greece
 Vitré, France

Greenport
 Mangalia, Romania

H
Honeoye Falls
 Borgne, Haiti

Horseheads
 Nakagawa, Japan

I
Irondequoit
 Poltava, Ukraine

Ithaca
 Eldoret, Kenya

J
Jamestown
 Jakobstad, Finland

K
Kinderhook
 Buren, Netherlands

N
Nassau County

 Pushkin, Russia
 Taichung, Taiwan

New Paltz
 Niimi, Japan

New Rochelle
 La Rochelle, France

New York City

 Athens, Greece
 Beijing, China
 Budapest, Hungary

 Jerusalem, Israel
 Johannesburg, South Africa
 London, England, United Kingdom
 Madrid, Spain

 Santo Domingo, Dominican Republic
 Tokyo, Japan

New York City – Brooklyn

 Anzio, Italy
 Beşiktaş, Turkey
 Bnei Brak, Israel
 Chaoyang (Beijing), China
 Gdynia, Poland
 Konak, Turkey
 Lambeth, England, United Kingdom
 Leopoldstadt (Vienna), Austria
 Üsküdar, Turkey
 Yiwu, China

New York City – Manhattan
 Seocho (Seoul), South Korea

O
Oneonta
 Krasnoyarsk, Russia

P
Peekskill

 Castlebar, Ireland
 Cuenca, Ecuador

R
Ramapo
 Beit Shemesh, Israel

Red Hook
 Mas-ha, Palestine

Rhinebeck
 Larreynaga, Nicaragua

Rochester

 Alytus, Lithuania
 Bamako, Mali
 Caltanissetta, Italy
 Hamamatsu, Japan
 Kraków, Poland
 Puerto Plata, Dominican Republic
 Rehovot, Israel
 Rennes, France
 Veliky Novgorod, Russia
 Waterford, Ireland
 Würzburg, Germany
 Xianyang, China

S
Saranac Lake

 Entrains-sur-Nohain, France
 Sainte-Agathe-des-Monts, Canada

Saratoga Springs
 Chekhov, Russia

Schenectady

 Kunming, China
 Nijkerk, Netherlands

Syracuse

 Chiayi, Taiwan
 Fuzhou, China
 Tampere, Finland

W
Warren County
 Saga, Japan

Woodstock
 Nimbin (Lismore), Australia

References

New York
Populated places in New York (state)
Sister cities of New York
Cities in New York (state)